Gymnophthalmus lineatus is a species of lizard in the family Gymnophthalmidae. It is found in Venezuela, Suriname, Aruba, Curaçao, and Bonaire.

References

Gymnophthalmus
Reptiles described in 1758
Taxa named by Carl Linnaeus